The Sheridan Plaza Hotel is a historic hotel located at the corner of Wilson Avenue and Sheridan Road in the Uptown neighborhood of Chicago, Illinois.

Overview
Construction on the hotel began in 1920, and the hotel opened in 1921. The hotel was designed by co-owner Walter Ahlschlager; the brick building features extensive terra cotta ornamentation, including terra cotta gargoyles on some of the top corners. The hotel was the first high-rise building in Uptown. The Chicago Cubs and visiting teams that played the Cubs stayed in the hotel; the building was also a popular site for weddings and dances. After the hotel closed, the building sat vacant and deteriorated significantly, and some of the terra cotta decorations fell off the side of the building. In 2009, a realty group renovated the property, which is now an apartment building.

Recognition
The hotel was added to the National Register of Historic Places on November 21, 1980.

References

1921 establishments in Illinois
Hotel buildings completed in 1921
Hotel buildings on the National Register of Historic Places in Chicago
Residential skyscrapers in Chicago